Danielle Martineau is a Canadian folk musician from Quebec, who has been associated with the bands Joséphine, Rockabayou, and Les Crapaudes. She is most noted as a three-time Juno Award nominee, receiving nods for Roots & Traditional Album of the Year – Solo at the Juno Awards of 1996 for Autrement and at the Juno Awards of 1997 for Bal Canaille, and for Children's Album of the Year at the Juno Awards of 1999 for Accordélidon.

Discography
Rockabayou - 1992
Autrement - 1994
Bal Canaille - 1996
Accordélidon - 1998
Les Secrets du vent - 2004

References

20th-century Canadian women musicians
21st-century Canadian women musicians
Canadian accordionists
Canadian folk musicians
Musicians from Quebec
French Quebecers
Living people